The Carnival was an American pop group formed by percussionist José Soares and vocalist Janis Hansen, both formerly of Sergio Mendes' Brasil '66. Initially a joint venture between Walter Wanderley and the original members of Brasil '66, the group eventually settled into a quartet augmented by Terry Fischer of the Murmaids and bassist Tommy Neal.

The quartet's Brasil '66-meets-5th Dimension sound was largely the brainchild of producer-engineer Bones Howe, who gathered L.A.'s Wrecking Crew studio musicians like Hal Blaine and Larry Knechtel for the project.

A self-titled album was released in 1969. Two singles, "Son of a Preacher Man" b/w "Walk On By" and "Laia Ladaia" b/w "Canto de Carnival", were issued to promote what was supposed to be their debut album. Despite Howe's name attached to the project, public reaction was minimal; and plans for a follow-up record were scrapped.  A single culled from the aborted sessions, "Where There's a Heartache (There Must Be a Heart)" b/w "The Truth About It", was put out in December 1970; but the Carnival had already dissolved by then.

Soares returned to Brazil, where not much has been heard about him since. Hansen left the mainstream music industry, married a lawyer in 1970, raised a family, at one point working as a state employee, but later focusing on producing and writing. Neal went to become a more active member of his local congregation. Fischer reinvented herself as a jazz singer; having toured with Frank Sinatra being among her notable credentials. She briefly relaunched the Murmaids with her sister and recorded a reunion album in 2002.

Fischer and Hansen both died in 2017, seven months apart from each other.

LPs / CDs 

The Carnival - 1969 - World Pacific Records WPS-21894

Side One:
 Canto de Carnival (The Carnival)
 Laia Ladaia (Edu Lobo/Ruy Guerra/Norman Gimbel)
 Sweets for My Sweet (Doc Pomus/Mort Shuman)
 Take Me for a Little While (Trade Martin)
 Turn, Turn, Turn (To Everything There Is a Season) (Pete Seeger)
 Hope (Louis Aldebert/Monique Aldebert)
 Walk On By (Burt Bacharach/Hal David)

Side Two:
 One Bright Night (A Famous Myth) (Jeffrey Camanor)
 Son of a Preacher Man (John Hurley/Ronnie Wilkins)
 Reach Out for Me (Bacharach/David)
 Love So Fine (Roger Nichols/Tony Asher)
 The Word (John Lennon/Paul McCartney)

The LP was re-released as a CD in 2004 by Rev-Ola Records. It contained the following additional tracks:

 Where There's a Heartache (There Must Be a Heart) (Bacharach/David)
 The Truth About It (Cheryl Ernst (Wells) music and lyrics)
 Son of a Preacher Man (Mono, as the original single release)

References
 The Carnival, Discogs.
 Patrick: The Carnival at gullbuy music review, November 23, 2004.

American pop music groups